Belchalwell is a small village in the civil parish of Okeford Fitzpaine in the Blackmore Vale, North Dorset, England. Belchalwell Street is sited on Upper Greensand, with Lower Belchalwell on the boundary of Gault and Kimmeridge Clay, both beneath the north slopes of Bell Hill, part of the Dorset Downs.

Belchalwell is Saxon in origin, with a medieval church, St Aldhelm's Church, much renovated. The name of the village describes a cold well on a hillside. The village has approximately 30 properties with fewer than a hundred residents, and is much reduced in size from former times, largely due to reductions in agricultural employment, which has always been the primary industry. One former resident was the TV personality Jack Hargreaves.

References

External links 

Villages in Dorset